Giuseppe Hyzler (1787 – 19 January 1858) was a Maltese painter. 

Born in Malta with a German background, he was awarded a scholarship by the Governor of Malta, Sir Thomas Maitland, in 1814, to pursue his artistics formation in Rome. There Hyzler joined the Nazarene movement, led by Friedrich Overbeck, of whom his brother Vincenzo Hyzler (1813-1849) had grown close. The Nazarenes lived in a community near Rome, wearing black dresses and long hair; they deemed sacred art as the highest cultural expression, in particular 14th-15th century frescoes. After the community dissolved, Giuseppe Hyzler returned to Malta in 1823, where he opened a private art school. He taught Amedeo Preziosi among others.

Hyzler was responsible for removing some of the Baroque art of Saint John's Co-Cathedral, including the ornate altar in the Chapel of the Langue of France.

By the mid-19th century he was deemed among the most accredited painters in Malta, a representative of neoclassicist and academic style, until the artistic scene was revolutionised by Romanticism as brought by Giuseppe Calì. In 1953, Edward Sammut remarked that "Their paintings are noted for the cold academism of the drawing and the rather forced classical poses of their figures."

Works 
 Madonna of the Rosary, 1840, Parish Church of St. Dominic, Valletta
 Our lady of Mount Carmel, Our Saviour's Church, Lija
 Buttresses on the nave walls, St. Catherine's Old Church, Żejtun
 Sketches of frescoes found in the ruined Old Church of Siġġiewi
 Relazione dello stato delle scuole del Disegno nell’Universita’ di Malta dal 1802 al 1850, anonymous work attributed to Hyzler by Dominic Cutajar.

Bibliography 
 John Debono, A short note on the artist Giuseppe Hyzler (1787-1858), Melita Historica, 2008
 Espinosa Rodriguez, A. (1997): The Nazarene movement and its impact on Maltese nineteenth century art (Master's dissertation) (online version)
 Dominic Cutajar, "1800-1860 The Art of Colonial Malta", in: The British Colonial Experience 1800-1964, ed. Victor Mallia-Milanes, pub. Malta 1988.

Notes 

 19th-century Maltese painters
Nazarene painters